Henri de Turenne (19 November 1921 – 23 August 2016) is a French journalist and screenwriter.

Life and career
Henri de Turenne was born in Tours. The son of Armand de Turenne, a World War I flying ace, he was raised in Germany and French Algeria, both countries becoming central creative themes in his adult work.

After the Second World War, de Turenne worked as a journalist for Agence France-Presse, Le Figaro, France Soir, and ORTF, reporting from Allied-occupied Germany, covering the Korean War and the Algerian War, and, in 1952, winning the Prix Albert Londres. 

Since the mid-1960s, he worked primarily in television, notably on the French Grandes Batailles series for Pathé, making over a hundred documentaries. He won an Emmy in 1982 for a documentary on the Vietnam War. His fictional works include Les Alsaciens ou les deux Mathilde (1996), made for Arte, for which he shared a 7 d'Or with Michel Deutsch.

Filmography

 Les Grandes Batailles (series: 1967–1975)
 Les évasions célèbres (1972)
 Les Grandes Batailles du Passé (series: 1973–1977)
 Le Loup blanc (1977)
 Les Grands déserts (1981)
 Fort Saganne (1984)
 Sixième gauche (1990) (TV)
 Maigret et le fantôme" (1994) (TV)
 Les alsaciens - ou les deux Mathilde (series: 1996–1997) (TV)
 La ferme du crocodile (1996) (TV)
 L'Algérie des chimères (2001) (TV)
 Apocalypse - La 2e guerre mondiale (2009) (TV)

Bibliography

 Turenne, Henri de; Ducher, François; Deutsch, Michel; (1996). Les Alsaciens, ou, Les deux Mathilde. Paris: Jean-Claude Lattès. 
 Turenne, Henri de; Soulé, Robert; (2000). L'Algérie des chimères''. Paris : Jean-Claude Lattès.

Notes and references

External links
 

1921 births
2016 deaths
French war correspondents
French male screenwriters
French screenwriters
Albert Londres Prize recipients
French male non-fiction writers